The Vans US Open of Surfing 2015 was an event of the Association of Surfing Professionals for 2015 ASP World Tour.

This event was held from July 27 to August 2 in Huntington Beach, California, United States.

The women's tournament was won by Johanne Defay of France, who beat Australian Sally Fitzgibbons in the final. The winner of the men's tournament was Hiroto Ohhara of Japan, with Tanner Hendrickson of Hawaii coming in second.

Women

Round 1

Round 2

Round 3

Round 4

Quarter finals

Semi finals

Final

See also
U.S. Open of Surfing

References

External links

2015 World Surf League
2015 in American sports
2015 in sports in California
Sports in Huntington Beach, California
Surfing in California
Women's surfing